Academia Chișinău was a Moldovan football club from Chișinău. They played in the Divizia Națională, the top division in Moldovan football.

History
Academia came into existence in 2006 when Igor Dobrovolski, Alexandru Cojuhari, and Eduard Rotari decided to create a club with which to facilitate the growth of football talent in Moldova. The club began its journey in the second Moldovan football division, the Divizia "A". By the end of their second season in 2007–08, Academia was promoted to the Divizia Națională. Upon promotion, the club signed a partnership agreement with the Technical University of Moldova, and became known as Academia UTM Chișinău.

List of seasons

Managers
 Igor Dobrovolski
 Vitalie Culibaba /  Oleg Bejenari
 Serghei Stroenco (2010–11)
 Veaceslav Rusnac (July 1, 2011 – Sept 5, 2012)
 Volodymyr Knysh (Sept 4, 2012 – May 31, 2013)
 Vitalie Mostovoi (July 26, 2013 – Dec 19, 2013)
 Valeriu Catana (Jan 18, 2014 – July 25, 2014)
 Vladimir Vusatîi (July 25, 2014–June, 2015)
 Yuriy Hroshev ( June, 2015–Sept, 2015)
 Vladimir Vusatîi (Sept, 2015–Oct, 2015)
 Vlad Goian (Oct, 2015 – 2016)

Notable players
 Igor Bugaiov
 Alexandru Dedov
 Radu Gînsari
 Alexandru Suvorov
 Igor Lambarschi

References

See also
 Official website 
 Profile at DiviziaNationala.com 

Football clubs in Moldova
Football clubs in Chișinău
Association football clubs established in 2006
2006 establishments in Moldova
University and college association football clubs
Association football clubs disestablished in 2017
2017 disestablishments in Moldova
Defunct football clubs in Moldova